Schulerud is a Norwegian surname. Notable people with the surname include:

Ingrid Schulerud (born 1959), Norwegian diplomat
Mentz Schulerud (1915–2003), Norwegian author, radio personality, and theatre director
Anne-Cath. Vestly, born Schulerud

Norwegian-language surnames